Vid Milenkovic (born July 21, 1995), is a Swiss professional basketball player for Lions de Genève of the Swiss Basketball League, the first-tier level of professional basketball league in Switzerland.

College career 
After graduating from the German School of Belgrade (DSB) in 2014, Vid decided to major in exercise science with minors in coaching and sport management while starting his college basketball career in the NCAA Division III, where he played six seasons at the University of Wisconsin-Superior, in which he averaged 10.39 points and 6.39 rebounds per game.

College statistics

Professional career 
After going undrafted in the 2020 NBA Draft, Milenkovic joined the roster of the Starwings Basket Regio Basel is a Swiss professional basketball club based in Basel. The club competes in the Swiss Basketball League (SBL), the highest tier of basketball in Switzerland.

On 2021, he signed with Lions de Genève, a professional basketball club based in the city of Geneva, Switzerland. The Lions currently play in the Swiss top-tier Swiss Basketball League (SBL).

Starwings 2021 Swiss Basketball Final Run 

Vid Milenkovic scored 26 Points against Neuchatel in the semifinals of the 2021 Swiss Basketball Playoffs, helping the Starwings to reach the finals for the first time in their history. In fact this is the first time a team from the Swiss german part has ever been to the finals in the history of Swiss Basketball. In the finals the Vid Milenkovic and the Starwings would loose to Fribourg Olympic. Despite the loss in the finals, this run has been considered a great success in Vid Milnkovic's first year as a pro. During the playoffs he averaged 13.3 points per game and was the most efficient Swiss player on his team.

National Team 
Vid Milenkovic participated in the 2015 FIBA Europe Under-20 Championship Division B. Milenkovic is currently part of the  21 Men Swiss National Team Roaster.

Off the court 
Besides playing professional basketball, Vid is also the founder and the head of the basketball community from Zurich called "BÖLLE". With BÖLLE Vid and his team try to promote the sport of Basketball in Zürich. Mostly it is through youth camps, public events and social media content. The biggest projects were, hosting a camp with 100 campers, building a court in Guinea and generating more than 3000 followers on instagram.

References

External links 
 Vid Milenkovic Stats in Basketball-Reference.com
 Realgm.com
 NCAA
 U20 
 Swiss National Team 

1995 births
Living people
Starwings Basel players